The 1948 United States elections were held on November 2, 1948. The election took place during the beginning stages of the Cold War. Democratic incumbent President Harry S. Truman was elected to a full term, defeating Republican nominee New York Governor Thomas E. Dewey and two erstwhile Democrats. The Republicans, who had just won both the House and the Senate two years earlier, ceded control of both chambers of Congress to the Democrats. Puerto Rico also elected Luis Muñoz Marín of the Popular Democratic Party as its first democratically elected governor.

President  

In what is considered by most historians as the greatest upset in the history of American presidential politics, Democratic incumbent President Harry S. Truman defeated Republican nominee Thomas E. Dewey. Going into Election Day, virtually every prediction (with or without public opinion polls) indicated that Truman would lose. Truman took most states outside the Northeast and Deep South, and won the popular vote by four points. Dewey won his party's nomination for the second straight election, defeating Ohio Senator Robert A. Taft and former Minnesota Governor Harold Stassen on the Republican convention's second ballot. Truman won the Democratic nomination on the first ballot, but the party's platform on civil rights caused a third party run by Dixiecrat Strom Thurmond, the Governor of South Carolina. Thurmond took four states in the Deep South. Former Vice President and former Democrat Henry A. Wallace ran as the Progressive nominee, but took only two percent of the popular vote.

United States House of Representatives 

As in the Senate, Truman's labeling of the Republican-controlled Congress as "obstructionist" helped the Democrats win a net gain of 75 seats in the House, giving them control of the chamber.

Future president Gerald Ford won his first election in this year, being elected to Michigan's 5th congressional district.

United States Senate 

The Democrats gained nine seats in the Senate, enough to give them control of the chamber over the Republicans. Truman successfully campaigned against an "obstructionist" Congress that had blocked many of his initiatives. In addition, the U.S. economy had recovered from the postwar recession of 1946–1947.

References

 
1948